RFJ may refer to:

 Radio fréquence Jura
 Relatives for Justice